Woubrugge is a village in the Dutch province of South Holland. It is located about 10 km east of the city of Leiden, in the municipality of Kaag en Braassem.

History 
The village was first mentioned in 1493 as Woubregge, and means "bridge over the Woudwetering". The Woutbroeke mentioned in 1252 is a different settlement. Woubrugge started as a peat excavation settlement, but turned into a linear agricultural settlement along the Woudwetering.

The Dutch Reformed church is a pseudo cruciform church between 1652 and 1653 and designed by Pieter Post. It has a twelve sided ridge turret with needle spire.

Woubrugge was home to 932 people in 1840. It was a separate municipality until 1991, when it became part of Jacobswoude. In 2009, it became part of the municipality of Kaag en Braassem.

Notable residents
 Hans Vijlbrief, born 17 August 1963, lives in Woubrugge, civil servant, economist, and State Secretary for Finance
 Henk Angenent, born 1 November 1967, lives in Woubrugge, former professional ice skater.
 Margot Boer, born 7 August 1985, professional ice skater, winner of two bronze medals on 2014 Winter Olympics.

Gallery

References

Populated places in South Holland
Former municipalities of South Holland
Kaag en Braassem